These are the Canadian number-one albums of 2005. The chart is compiled by Nielsen Soundscan and published by Jam! Canoe, issued every Sunday. The chart also appears in Billboard magazine as Top Canadian Albums.

See also
List of number-one singles of 2005 (Canada)

References

External links
Top 100 albums in Canada on Jam
Billboard Top Canadian Albums

2005
Canada albums
2005 in Canadian music